In abstract algebra, a branch of mathematics, a simple ring is a non-zero ring that has no two-sided ideal besides the zero ideal and itself. In particular, a commutative ring is a simple ring if and only if it is a field. 

The center of a simple ring is necessarily a field. It follows that a simple ring is an associative algebra over this field. So, simple algebra and simple ring are synonyms.

Several references (e.g., Lang (2002) or Bourbaki (2012)) require in addition that a simple ring be left or right Artinian (or equivalently semi-simple). Under such terminology a non-zero ring with no non-trivial two-sided ideals is called quasi-simple.

According to the Artin–Wedderburn theorem, every simple ring that is left or right Artinian is a matrix ring over a division ring.  In particular, the only simple rings that are a finite-dimensional vector space over the real numbers are rings of matrices over either the real numbers, the complex numbers, or the quaternions.

An example of a simple ring that is not a matrix ring over a division ring is the Weyl algebra.

Characterization 
A nonzero ring is a simple algebra if it contains no two-sided ideals other than the zero ideal and the ring itself.

An immediate example of simple algebras are division algebras, where every nonzero element has a multiplicative inverse, for instance, the real algebra of quaternions. Also, for any , the algebra of  matrices with entries in a division ring is simple. In fact, this characterizes all finite-dimensional simple algebras up to isomorphism, i.e., any simple algebra that is finite-dimensional over its center is isomorphic to a matrix algebra over some division ring. This was proved in 1907 by Joseph Wedderburn in his doctoral thesis, On hypercomplex numbers, which appeared in the Proceedings of the London Mathematical Society. Wedderburn's thesis classified simple and semisimple algebras. Simple algebras are building blocks of semisimple algebras: any finite-dimensional semisimple algebra is a Cartesian product, in the sense of algebras, of simple algebras.

Wedderburn's result was later generalized to semisimple rings in the Artin–Wedderburn theorem.

Examples 
Let  be the field of real numbers,  be the field of complex numbers, and  the quaternions.
These results follow from the Frobenius theorem.
 Every finite-dimensional central simple algebra over a finite field is isomorphic to a matrix ring over that field.
 For a commutative ring, the four following properties are equivalent: being a semisimple ring; being Artinian and reduced; being a reduced Noetherian ring of Krull dimension 0; and being isomorphic to a finite direct product of fields.

Wedderburn's theorem 

Wedderburn's theorem characterizes simple rings with a unit and a minimal left ideal. (The left Artinian condition is a generalization of the second assumption.) Namely it says that every such ring is, up to isomorphism, a ring of  matrices over a division ring.

It is not hard to show that every left ideal in  takes the following form:

,

for some fixed subset .

,

for a given . In other words, if  is a minimal left ideal, then , where  is the idempotent matrix with 1 in the  entry and zero elsewhere.

The above example suggests the following lemma:

Lemma.  is a ring with identity  and an idempotent element , where .

Then  is injective because if , then , which implies that .

For surjectivity, let . So

.

This proves the lemma.

Wedderburn's theorem follows readily from the lemma.

Theorem (Wedderburn). If  is a simple ring with unit  and a minimal left ideal , then  is isomorphic to the ring of  matrices over a division ring.

One simply has to verify the assumptions of the lemma hold, i.e. find an idempotent  such that , and then show that  is a division ring.  The assumption  follows from  being simple.

See also 
 Simple (algebra)
 Simple universal algebra

References
 A. A. Albert, Structure of algebras, Colloquium publications 24, American Mathematical Society, 2003, .  P.37.

 
 
Ring theory